Pavol Regenda (born 7 December 1999) is a Slovak professional ice hockey player for the San Diego Gulls of the American Hockey League (AHL), as a prospect for the Anaheim Ducks of the National Hockey League (NHL).

Playing career
During the 2021–22 season, he recorded 15 goals and 24 assists in 43 games for HK Dukla Michalovce. He was the top scorer in the Extraliga among players 22 and under.

Following two break-out seasons with Dukla Michalovce, Regenda was originally signed to a contract in the Czech Extraliga with BK Mladá Boleslav on 1 May 2022. However, after a strong showing in the World Championships, Regenda used his NHL out-clause to break his contract with BK Mladá Boleslav, and on 1 June 2022, he was signed by the Anaheim Ducks to a two-year, entry-level contract beginning with the 2022–23 NHL season. On 31 October 2022, he was assigned to the Ducks' AHL affiliate, the San Diego Gulls. Before being assigned to the Gulls, he recorded two assists in five NHL games.

International play

Regenda represented Slovakia at the 2017 IIHF World U18 Championships and recorded one assist in five games. He then represented Slovakia at the 2019 World Junior Ice Hockey Championships and recorded one goal, and two assists in five games.

On 18 January 2022, he was named to the roster to represent Slovakia at the 2022 Winter Olympics. He recorded one goal and three assists in seven games and won a bronze medal.

Career statistics

Regular season and playoffs

International

References

External links

 

1999 births
Living people
Anaheim Ducks players
People from Michalovce
Sportspeople from the Košice Region
HK Dukla Michalovce players
Kiekko-Vantaa players
Ice hockey players at the 2022 Winter Olympics
BK Mladá Boleslav players
Olympic ice hockey players of Slovakia
Medalists at the 2022 Winter Olympics
Olympic bronze medalists for Slovakia
Olympic medalists in ice hockey
San Diego Gulls (AHL) players
Undrafted National Hockey League players
Slovak expatriate ice hockey players in the United States
Slovak expatriate ice hockey players in Finland
Slovak expatriate ice hockey players in Sweden